The receiver general for Canada is responsible for making payments to the Government of Canada each fiscal year, accepting payments from financial institutions and preparing the Public Accounts of Canada, containing annual audited financial statements of the Government of Canada. The receiver general deposits and withdraws funds from the Consolidated Revenue Fund of Canada.

The minister of public services and procurement is the receiver general for Canada. The Department of Public Works and Government Services Act, 1996 states: "In the Minister's capacity as Receiver General, the Minister shall exercise all the powers and perform all the duties and functions assigned to the receiver general by law."

Receivers General 
The first holder was Walter Murray, who was related to then Governor of Quebec James Murray from 1764. Murray was succeeded by Sir Thomas Mills from 1765 to 1777. Mills was often absent thus his office was held in acting by subordinates: Hector Theophilus Cramahe from 1766 to 1770 and Thomas Dunn from 1770 to 1777). Mills was returned to the post from 1777 until he was forced out in 1789 The office was replaced by the division of Quebec into Upper Canada and Lower Canada in 1791.

Pre-Confederation colonies of Lower Canada, New Brunswick, Nova Scotia, Prince Edward Island, Upper Canada and the Province of Canada each had this post.

From 1867 to 1879 it was a standalone position with minister of finance as ex officio. R.B. Bennett (1926, 1930–32) and Mackenzie Bowell (1896) are the only Prime Ministers to hold the title (Tupper held post before becoming a Prime Minister as Minister of Finance). From 1879 to 1968 it was held mainly by the minister of finance. Reverting as standalone in 1968 and transferred to the minister of supply and services in 1979. From 1980 to 1984 there was no cabinet title but under the authority of the minister of supply and services before reappearing in 1984. In 1996 the role was merged into the minister of public works with new title as minister of public works and government services and then as minister of public services and procurement since 2015.

List of receivers general since 1867:
 Edward Kenny 1867–1869, as Senator
 Jean-Charles Chapais 1869–1873, as Senator
 Théodore Robitaille 1873, as Senator 
 Thomas Coffin 1873-1878
 John Mortimer Courtney 1878, as acting (Deputy RG and non MP)
 Alexander Campbell 1878–1879, as Senator
 Samuel Leonard Tilley 1879-1885
 John Mortimer Courtney 1885 as acting (Deputy RG and non MP)
 Archibald McLelan 1885-1887
 Charles Tupper 1887-1888
 George Eulas Foster 1888–1891, 1891-1896
 Mackenzie Bowell 1896
 John Mortimer Courtney 1896 as acting
 William Stevens Fielding 1896-1911
 William Thomas White 1911-1919
 Henry Lumley Drayton 1919-1920
 William Stevens Fielding 1921-1925
 James Robb 1925-1926
 Henry Lumley Drayton 1926 as acting
 Richard Bedford Bennett 1926
 James Robb 1926-1929
 John C. Saunders  1929
 Charles Avery Dunning 1929-1930
 Richard Bedford Bennett 1930-1932
 Edgar Nelson Rhodes 1932-1935
 Charles Avery Dunning 1935-1939
 James Ralston 1939-1940
 James Lorimer Ilsley 1940-1946
 Douglas Abbott 1946-1954
 Walter Edward Harris 1954-1957
 Donald Fleming 1957-1962
 George Nowlan 1962-1963
 Walter L. Gordon 1963-1965
 Mitchell Sharp 1965-1968
 Edgar Benson 1968-1969
 Don Jamieson 1969
 James Armstrong Richardson 1969-1972
 Jean-Pierre Goyer 1972-1978
 Pierre de Bané 1978-1979
 Roch La Salle 1979
 Charles Lapointe 1984
 Harvie Andre 1984-1985
 Stewart McInnes 1985-1986
 Monique Vézina 1986-1987
 Michel Côté 1987-1988
 Stewart McInnes 1988 as acting
 Lucien Bouchard 1988-1989
 Paul Dick 1989-1993
 David Dingwall 1993-1996
 Diane Marleau 1996-1997
 Alfonso Gagliano 1997-2002
 Don Boudria 2002
 Ralph Goodale 2002-2003
 Stephen Owen 2003-2004
 Scott Brison 2004-2006
 Michael Fortier 2006-2008
 Christian Paradis 2008-2010
 Rona Ambrose 2010-2013
 Diane Finley 2013-2015
 Judy Foote 2015-2017
 Carla Qualtrough 2017-2019
 Anita Anand 2019-2021
 Filomena Tassi 2021-2022
 Helena Jaczek 2022-

See also

The position of receiver general existed in the United Kingdom and in various Commonwealth countries, and still exists in Massachusetts and provincially within Canada.

External links
 Receiver General for Canada Official Website

References

Federal departments and agencies of Canada
Canadian ministers